Zoraida Virginia Gómez Sánchez (born May 31, 1985 in Mexico City, Mexico) is a Mexican actress known for her performance in Rebelde.

Biography
She is the sister of actors Eleazar Gómez, Alizair Gómez and Jairo Gómez. Eleazar and Zoraida Gómez acted together in the novel Rebelde (2004-2006). With only four years old appeared in an ad with Alejandra Guzmán.

Music
While in Rebelde, she and two other costars formed the band Citrus or c3Q's, which only made one song called "No Me Importa" (I Don't Care). The band was formed to promote Herbal Essences shampoo (RBD's song "Liso y Sensual" was also used to promote the same name shampoo and Anahí was the brand spokesperson).

Name
The name "Zoraida" originates from Don Quixote by Cervantes, where it is the name of a beautiful Moorish woman from Algiers who converts to Christianity and elopes with a Spanish officer.

Men's magazine 
In January 2011 appeared on the cover of magazine H Hombres Mexico, where, in addition to the publicity gained abandoned the image of teenagers who had.

Filmography

Telenovelas
La Mujer Del Vendaval (2012/13) Nuria Arevalo de Serratos 
Cuando Me Enamoro (2010) Julieta
Llena de Amor (2010) Fedra Curiel (Young)
Niña de mi Corazon (2010)  Carolina Clavados
En Nombre del Amor (2008) Liliana Martínez
Lola...Érase una vez (2007) Rafaela Santo Domingo
Rebelde (2004–2006) as Jose Lujan Landeros
Enamorate (2003) as Darketa
Aqua y Aceite (2002) as Mariana
Azul (1996) as La Chamos
" Canaveral de Pasiones" (1996) Julia de nina

Series
Como dice el dicho (2012) as Nicky

Films
Mujeres Infieles (1995)
La Orilla de la Tierra (1994)

References

External links
Official Site

1985 births
Living people
Mexican child actresses
Mexican telenovela actresses
Actresses from Mexico City